The 2007 Croatian Cup Final was a two-legged affair played between Dinamo Zagreb and Slaven Belupo. 
The first leg was played in Zagreb on 9 May 2007, while the second leg on 26 May 2007 in Koprivnica.

Dinamo Zagreb won the trophy with an aggregate result of 2–1.

Road to the final

First leg

Second leg

External links
Official website 

2007 Final
GNK Dinamo Zagreb matches
Cup Final